Dagar, the Desert Hawk was a fictional character appearing in comic books published by Fox Feature Syndicate. Dagar first appeared in All Great Comics #13 (December 1947), with pencils by Edmond Good.

Dagar was a desert adventurer, much like how Tarzan was a jungle adventurer. He usually appeared wearing a traditional Bedouin robe (in the style of Lawrence of Arabia). Dagar's romantic interest was the beautiful Ayesha. He fought Bedu raiders, ant-men, mad scientists and mummies.

After his first appearance, All Great Comics was renamed Dagar, Desert Hawk, starting with issue #14 (February 1948). The final issue was #23 (April 1949). Dagar made one last appearance in All Top Comics #18 (July 1949).

References 

Fox Feature Syndicate adventure heroes
Golden Age adventure heroes